Glossop Road Baths is a building in Sheffield, South Yorkshire, England, which originally housed a swimming pool and Turkish baths.

The first public baths in the city were opened on the site in 1836, following the cholera epidemic of 1832. The complex was rebuilt from 1877 to 1879 to a design by E. M. Gibbs, including an indoor swimming pool was opened, a Turkish bath suite and a hairdresser. In 1898, the complex was bought by the city council and a ladies' bath was added.  The facade was rebuilt in 1908–1910 by Arthur Nunweek.

After a period of decline at the end of the 20th century and later closure of the baths, the building was largely converted to residential accommodation, with a Wetherspoons bar called "The Swim Inn" in the former main swimming pool area. The Turkish baths were fully modernised and reopened as Spa 1877 in 2004, but closed again in 2019.

References
Ruth Harman and John Minnis, Sheffield (Pevsner Architectural Guides)

External links 
VICTORIAN TURKISH BATHS:Glossop Road Turkish Baths
Spa 1877
City council's leisure guide information
Historical perspective on the turkish baths

Buildings and structures in Sheffield
Cultural infrastructure completed in 1879